Arthur Philip Lamneck (March 12, 1880 – April 23, 1944) was a four-term U.S. Representative from Ohio from 1931 to 1939.

Early life and career 
Born in Port Washington, Ohio, Lamneck was the son of Philip and Mary Lamneck. He attended the public schools and graduated from the Port Washington High School in 1897. He engaged in the sheet metal business at Columbus, Ohio, from 1907 to 1929. Lamneck served as delegate to the Democratic National Convention in 1924. He served as member of the Columbus City Council from 1913 to 1921.

Congress 
Lamneck was elected as a Democrat to the Seventy-second and to the three succeeding Congresses (March 4, 1931 – January 3, 1939). He was an unsuccessful candidate for reelection in 1938 to the Seventy-sixth Congress and for election in 1940 to the Seventy-seventh Congress.

He was an unsuccessful candidate for nomination for mayor of Columbus, in 1943.

Later career and death 
He engaged in the wholesale coal business from 1939 until his death from dropsy at Columbus, April 23, 1944. Lamneck was interred in Port Washington Cemetery in Port Washington, Ohio.

References

External links
 

1880 births
1944 deaths
People from Port Washington, Ohio
Columbus City Council members
American manufacturing businesspeople
20th-century American politicians
Democratic Party members of the United States House of Representatives from Ohio